The Great Seal of the State of Utah was adopted on April 3, 1896, at the first regular session of the Legislature (January, February, March, April 1896). The original seal was designed by Harry Edwards & C. M. Jackson and cost $65.00, . The great seal is described in Utah Code Annotated, 1953, Volume 7a, section 67-2-9 as follows:

Seal of the Governor

There is also an official seal of the Governor of Utah. Borrowing most of the same symbolism from the state seal, the Governor's seal includes Roman numerals at the bottom, which represent the Governor himself, and this changes with every new Governor. Each Governor therefore has a seal unique to themselves and their administration. The Roman numerals are currently "XVII", representing Gary Herbert, who is the 17th governor of Utah since statehood. The seal was designed after the California Governor's Seal by Ronald L. Fox of Salt Lake City, Utah in 1992.

Enhanced variant
An artist at the Colonial Flag Company, produced the artwork for the corrected Utah State flag used during the Legislative process. Although colors were not included in the law describing the Utah State Flag as adopted in 1912 and amended in 1913, they were described in other state documents. Utah officials asked that those colors be used. However, they declined to include an illustration with the House Concurrent Resolution, saying that was not possible.

As with many flags with seals and coats of arms, there is room for artistic interpretation while still following correct designs. Paul Swenson, who as the President of Colonial Flag Company had paid for the prototype design, felt the eagle as shown in that design was weak and unattractive. He had graphic artist Perry Van Schelt strengthen the design while following the same description and using the same colors as employed in the prototype. Advisors in the project included John Hartvigsen, David Rindlisbach and Ronald L. Fox, Fox suggested the flag on the seal would have 45 stars divided between the two U.S. Flags shown on the seal, Utah was the 45th State. Both the prototype and the enhance designs are correct and follow the law and intent of the 2011 legislation. Only a few hundred flags were ordered using the prototype design, and most flags now being made and sold use the enhanced design, but legally flag manufacturers are free to use either version.

Symbolism

References

External links
Great Seal of the State of Utah

Symbols of Utah
Utah
Utah
Utah
Utah
Utah
Utah